Houcine Toulali (1924–1998) was a Moroccan writer and singer of Malhun compositions. He wrote hundreds of qasidas. 
He was born in Meknes in the Toulal neighbourhood. In the seventies of the 20th century Toulali abandoned his job as flower vendor at the central market of the new city of Meknes to devote himself completely to music at the national music school of Dar Jamai where he followed lessons of Andalus music and graduated as player of the luth. He then played with the orchestra of Moulay Ahmed Mdaghri and later established his own "Orchestre de Meknès de la musique du Malhoun" (Orchestra of Meknes of Malhun music). Still later Haj Houcine Toulali created a school where his music would be taught.

Some of his best known songs include Mahboub Al Kalb, Al Saki, Fatma, Zin El Fassi, Nkar El Hssane, Al Haraz and Al Tawassoulate.

External links
Yabiladi.com (13-10-2005) Saïd El Meftahi, "Houssein Toulali, le chantre du Melhoun, ou une vie entière dédiée à l'Art"  (retrieved 28-09-2011)

1924 births
1998 deaths
Moroccan songwriters
20th-century Moroccan poets
People from Meknes
20th-century poets